How Poets Are Losing Their Illusions is a 1985 Czechoslovak comedy film directed by Dušan Klein and written by Klein, together with Ladislav Pecháček. The second in the "Poets hexalogy", the title is preceded by How the World Is Losing Poets (1982) and followed by How Poets Are Enjoying Their Lives (1988), Konec básníků v Čechách (1993), Jak básníci neztrácejí naději (2004), and Jak básníci čekají na zázrak (2016). The film stars Pavel Kříž and David Matásek, and focuses on the young poet Štěpán Šafránek as he studies to become a doctor in Prague.

Synopsis
Friends and former small-town classmates Štěpán and Kendy are both studying in Prague—Štěpán is taking medicine at Charles University, while Kendy studies directing at FAMU. Kendy's studies are going well, but Štěpán struggles, both with course load and with finances. Kendy advises his friend to make connections with a rich family by meeting their eighteen-year-old daughter, Saša, who, though not quite attractive, longs for a boyfriend. Štěpán's attempt at courtship ends in disaster, however. He subsequently meets a beautiful medical student nicknamed "the cave", who is also romantically pursued by the unpleasant Dr. Fast. Štěpán attempts to impress her by acing his studies, but in the end, his quest ends in disappointment.

Cast and characters

 Pavel Kříž as Štepán Šafránek
 David Matásek as Kendy
 Míla Myslíková as Šafránková
 Adriana Tarábková as "the cave"
 Karel Roden as Honza Antoš
 Eva Jeníčková as Vendulka "Utěšitelka"
 Joseph Dielle as Numira "Mireček"
 Václav Svoboda as Venoš Pastyřík
 František Filipovský as Adolf Valerián

 Zdeněk Svěrák as Dr. Zajíc
 Jiří Štěpnička as Dr. Fast
 Lucie Juricková as Saša
 Jan Přeučil as Dr. Sejkora
 Josef Somr as Prof. Ječmen
 Michaela Dolinová as Eva
 Adolf Filip as Kendy's dad (uncredited)
 Ondřej Vetchý as Karabec (uncredited)

References

External links
 

1985 films
Czechoslovak comedy films
Czech comedy films
1985 comedy films
Czech sequel films
1980s Czech-language films
1980s Czech films